This is a list in alphabetical order of cricketers who have played for Kurunegala Youth Cricket Club in first-class matches. Where there is an article, the link comes before the club career span, and the scorecard name (typically initials and surname) comes after. If no article is present, the scorecard name comes before the span.

T
 Tharaka Waduge (2006–07 to 2016–17) : W. W. P. Taraka
 M. I. Thahir (2000–01)
 P. A. Theekshana (2019–20)
 W. C. R. Tissera (2006–07 to 2012–13)
 S. Tyron (2017–18 to 2020–21)

U
 Eric Upashantha (1991–92) : K. E. A. Upashantha

V
 B. C. Vijayabandara (2017–18 to 2018–19)

W	
 G. A. Waligamage (2020–21 to 2022)
 W. K. T. Wanniarachchi (2017–18 to 2022–23)
 A. Wanninayake (2021–22 to 2022–23)
 J. P. Weerabaddana (1999–2000 to 2000–01)
 T. A. Weerappuli (2005–06)
 M. Weerasinghe (2022)
 Asela Wewalwala (1999–2000 to 2005–06) : A. S. Wewalwala
 H. A. Wickramasekara (2011–12)
 M. D. Wijayathilaka (2022)
 D. D. Wijayawickrama (2011–12)
 S. P. T. Wijerathna (2022 to 2022–23)
 C. M. K. K. Wijeratne (2013–14 to 2017–18)
 T. Wijesinghe (1998–99)
 Tharinda Wijesinghe (2017–18 to 2022–23) : W. A. D. T. Wijesinghe
 R. U. A. Wijesiri (2012–13)
 S. A. M. Witharanage (2006–07)

References	
	
	
	
	
	
Kurunegala Youth Cricket Club